Neolentiporus is a fungal genus in the family Fomitopsidaceae. It contains Neolentiporus squamosellus and the type species N. maculatissimus. The genus was circumscribed by mycologist Mario Rajchenberg in 1995.

Description
Neolentiporus is characterized by medium to large fruit bodies that have stipes and a poroid hymenium on the cap underside. The caps are circular to fan-shaped with a scaly surface, and have an off-centre or lateral stipe that sometimes is reduced to a short, robust umbo. The hyphal system is dimitic with clamped, irregularly thick-walled generative hyphae that do not react with cresyl-blue stain. The skeletal hyphae are unbranched, thick-walled, and are strongly metachromatic in cresyl-blue. Spores are cylindrical, hyaline, thin-walled, inamyloid, and binucleate. Neolentiporus causes a brown rot. Molecular phylogenetic analysis shows Neolentiporus to be closely related to Buglossoporus. This latter genus, however, has a monomitic hyphal system in the trama, and lacks metachromatic skeletal hyphae.

References

External links

Fomitopsidaceae
Polyporales genera
Taxa described in 1995